The Society for the Promotion of the Physical Exploration of the Dutch Colonies (Dutch: Maatschappij ter Bevordering van het Natuurkundig Onderzoek der Nederlandsche Koloniën) was founded on 14 May 1890 in Amsterdam, with the mission of increasing the knowledge of the botany of the Dutch colonies.

This knowledge had applications both in pure science, as well as the fields of agriculture and industry. To that end, from the late 19th century to the eve of World War II, the Society equipped expeditions to explore Dutch overseas territories.

A number of famous classical and exploration trips to, among other Borneo and Dutch New Guinea were developed by and under the auspices of the Society and the Indian Committee for Scientific Investigations, a sister organisation in Batavia, Dutch East Indies.

Main expeditions
 1899-1900 - The Siboga Expedition of Max Weber
 1903 - The North New Guinea Expedition of A. Wichmann
 1907 - The First South New Guinea Expedition of H.A. Lorentz
 1909-1910 - De Second South New Guinea Expedition of H.A. Lorentz
 1912-1913 - De Third South New Guinea Expedition of A. Franssen Herderschee
 1935-1936 - De Mimika Expedition of H.J.T. Bijlmer

Dutch Empire
History of New Guinea
Research institutes in the Netherlands